Adélio Maria Costa (born 19 December 1987), also known as Adélio Guterres, is Timor Lestean football player.

International goals

References

External links
 

1987 births
Living people
East Timorese footballers
East Timorese men's futsal players
Timor-Leste international footballers
Association football forwards